Puig d'Arques is a mountain of Catalonia, Spain. It has an elevation of 532 metres above sea level.

See also
Catalan Coastal Range
Mountains of Catalonia

References

Mountains of Catalonia